The Columbus Correctional Institution (also CCI or CCDC) is a medium security prison for adult males, near Brunswick, North Carolina. The prison's original dormitory block, built during the late 1930s, is still in use. During the 1970s inmates under the supervision of correction engineers built a recreation area including a 28 cell unit to house inmates who been placed under administrative and/or disciplinary segregation.

The facility offers adult education and  GED preparation classes. Inmates may take courses on substance abuse.  The total staff is 241 (as of February 2017) and has a maximum inmate capacity of just under 700.

References

Prisons in North Carolina
Buildings and structures in Columbus County, North Carolina
1930s establishments in North Carolina